William Christopher Prout (December 24, 1886 – August 4, 1927) was an American athlete.  He competed at the 1908 Summer Olympics in London and was president of the American Olympic Committee.  He was also the tenth state deputy of the Massachusetts Knights of Columbus from 1921 to 1924.  He stood for election to become the District Attorney of Suffolk County, Massachusetts in 1926, but lost.

Early life
He was born in the West End of Boston, Massachusetts on December 24, 1886.  He was frail as a child.  He attended Boston Latin School and English High School in Andover, Massachusetts, and then Brown University and Boston University where he was president of his class.  He is in the Brown University Athletic Hall of Fame.

Athletics
Prout won his preliminary heat of the 400 metres at the 1908 Summer Olympics with a time of 50.4 seconds.  He advanced to the semifinals, where he was eliminated following a fourth and last place finish in his semifinal heat.

He was elected president of the American Athletic Union in 1921. Prout founded the Boston Irish-American Athletic Association. From 1926 until his death, he was president of the American Olympic Committee.

Knights of Columbus
Prout served as the tenth state deputy of the Massachusetts Knights of Columbus from 1921 to 1924.  He was also a Supreme Director from 1922 to 1927.  As a knight, he sponsored the resolution that led to the creation of the Columbian Squires.

For his service to the Catholic Church he was made a knight of the Order of St. Gregory the Great in 1924.

References

Works cited
 
 
 
 

Boston University people
1886 births
1927 deaths
Athletes (track and field) at the 1908 Summer Olympics
Olympic track and field athletes of the United States
American male sprinters
Boston University alumni
Brown University alumni
Boston Latin School alumni
Presidents of the United States Olympic Committee
People from the West End, Boston